The Chivruay Pass incident is the death of ten ski hikers in the Lovozero Massif in the Soviet Union between 27 and 28 January 1973. The trekking group, who were all from the Kuibyshev Aviation Institute, had been hiking the slopes of Lovozero Massif in an area of Chivruay Pass.

After the group's bodies were discovered, an investigation by Soviet Union authorities determined that all ten had died from hypothermia.

Participants       
Михаил Кузнецов – Mikhail Kuznetsov (24) – leader of the group
Сергей Гусев – Sergey Gusev (17)
Юрий Кривов – Yuri Krivov (17)
Александр Новосёлов – Alexander Novosyolov (18)
Анатолий Пирогов – Anatoly Pirogrov (17)
Лидия Мартина – Lydia Martina (26)
Юрий Ушков – Yuri Ushkov (18)
Валентин Землянов – Valentin Zemlyanov (23)
Артём Лекант – Artyom Lekant (17)
Илья Альтшуллер – Ilya Altshuller (23)

Bibliography 
 Волков Е. Из похода не вернулись // Турист. — 1973. — No. 6. — С. 12–13.
 Лукоянов П. И. Чивруайская трагедия // Безопасность в лыжных походах и чрезвычайных ситуациях зимних условий — М.: ЦДЮТур РФ, 1998, — С. 81, 121—122.
 Забытая трагедия на Чивруае // Наше время. – Новокуйбышевск. – декабрь 2017.
 Шабалина И. Исторические версии. О гибели десяти куйбышевцев во время лыжного похода по Кольскому полуострову // Самарская газета от 25 марта 2018.
 Назарова А. «Случившееся обросло загадками»: Нижегородец собрался в экспедицию на Кольский полуостров // Комсомольская правда от 23 января 2019.
 Андреева Е. По следам, заметённым десятками зим // Мурманский вестник. — 13 февраля 2019. — С. 1, 4.
Как в 1973 году при странных обстоятельствах в горах Кольского полуострова погибли туристы. https://news.rambler.ru/other/41786563-kak-v-1973-godu-pri-strannyh-obstoyatelstvah-v-gorah-kolskogo-poluostrova-pogibli-turisty/?updated

See also 
 Dyatlov Pass incident
 Khamar-Daban pass incident
 (in Russian) Disappearance of the Klochkov's group of tourists

External links 
 Чивруай оставил их молодыми навеки 

1973 in the Soviet Union
Sport deaths in the Soviet Union
January 1973 events in Europe
Murmansk Oblast